Uralsky (masculine), Uralskaya (feminine), or Uralskoye (neuter) is the name of several inhabited localities in Russia.

Modern localities
Urban localities
Uralsky, Perm Krai, a work settlement in Nytvensky District of Perm Krai
Uralsky, Sverdlovsk Oblast, a settlement in Sverdlovsk Oblast under the administrative jurisdiction of the closed administrative-territorial formation of the same name

Rural localities
Uralsky, Republic of Bashkortostan, a village in Almukhametovsky Selsoviet of Abzelilovsky District of the Republic of Bashkortostan
Uralsky, Orenburg Oblast, a settlement in Uralsky Selsoviet of Pervomaysky District of Orenburg Oblast
Uralsky, Udmurt Republic, a selo in Uralsky Selsoviet of Sarapulsky District of the Udmurt Republic
Uralskoye, Leningrad Oblast, a settlement of the crossing in Plodovskoye Settlement Municipal Formation of Priozersky District of Leningrad Oblast
Uralskoye, Orenburg Oblast, a selo in Uralsky Selsoviet of Kvarkensky District of Orenburg Oblast
Uralskoye, Perm Krai, a selo under the administrative jurisdiction of the city of krai significance of Chaykovsky, Perm Krai
Uralskaya, a village in Berezovsky Selsoviet of Kuraginsky District of Krasnoyarsk Krai

Historical localities
Uralsky, Volgograd Oblast, formerly a rural locality (a settlement) in Kirovsky Selsoviet of Sredneakhtubinsky District of Volgograd Oblast; merged into the city of Volzhsky in April 2012